Arthur Alper (born June 4, 1928, in Los Angeles, California) is an American former volleyball player. He won a gold medal at the 1959 Pan American Games as a member of the United States men's volleyball team.

References

1928 births
Living people
American men's volleyball players
Volleyball players at the 1959 Pan American Games
Pan American Games gold medalists for the United States
Pan American Games medalists in volleyball
Volleyball players from Los Angeles
Medalists at the 1959 Pan American Games